Mississippi Wetlands Management District is a National Wildlife Refuge complex in the state of Mississippi.  It was established in 1989 and manages lands in 26 counties in the northern part of the state.

Refuges within the complex
 Dahomey National Wildlife Refuge
 Tallahatchie National Wildlife Refuge

References
PDF description of the district

National Wildlife Refuges in Mississippi
Protected areas established in 1989